Rodrigues is an island in the Indian Ocean, administratively part of Mauritius.

Rodrigues may also refer to:

Places
Rodrigues Triple Junction, a tectonic triple junction near Rodrigues
Rodrigues College, a secondary school on Rodrigues
Fr. Conceicao Rodrigues College of Engineering, an engineering institute in Mumbai, India
Cândido Rodrigues, a municipality in São Paulo, Brazil

People
 Rodrigues (surname)
 Rodrigues (footballer) (born 1997), Brazilian footballer

Other uses
 Rodrigues solitaire, an extinct flightless bird that was endemic to the island of Rodrigues
 Rodrigues' rotation formula, a vector formula for a rotation in space, given its axis
 Rodrigues' formula, a mathematical expression

See also
 Rodriguez (disambiguation)
 Rodriquez (disambiguation)